Solariella dedonderorum is a species of sea snail, a marine gastropod mollusk in the family Solariellidae.

Description
The size of the shell varies between 2.6 mm and 5 mm.

Distribution
This marine species occurs off the Philippines

References

 Poppe G.T., Tagaro S.P. & Dekker H. (2006) The Seguenziidae, Chilodontidae, Trochidae, Calliostomatidae and Solariellidae of the Philippine Islands. Visaya Supplement 2: 1-228.

External links
 World Register of Marine Species
 
 Williams S.T., Smith L.M., Herbert D.G., Marshall B.A., Warén A., Kiel S., Dyal P., Linse K., Vilvens C. & Kano Y. (2013) Cenozoic climate change and diversification on the continental shelf and slope: evolution of gastropod diversity in the family Solariellidae (Trochoidea). Ecology and Evolution 3(4): 887–917

dedonderorum
Gastropods described in 2006